Ehud "Udi" Goldwasser (18 July 1975 – 12 July 2006) was an Israeli soldier who was abducted in Israel by Hezbollah along with Eldad Regev on 12 July 2006, sparking the 2006 Lebanon War. His rank was First Sergeant.

On 16 July 2008, the bodies of Goldwasser and Regev were returned to Israel in the 2008 Israel–Hezbollah prisoner exchange. Israeli officials claimed an examination of the bodies determined that the two reservists were killed during the ambush. A Lebanese minister claimed the soldiers were killed during the Israeli bombing.

Biography
Prior to his abduction at Israel's border with Lebanon, Ehud "Udi" Goldwasser lived in Nahariya. He was a graduate student at the Technion, the Israeli Institute of Technology, from which he had earlier earned an undergraduate degree in environmental engineering.

As a teenager, he lived in South Africa with his parents, Shlomo and Mickey, and two younger brothers. In 2005, he married Karnit, who would later campaign globally for his release. He was interested in environmental conservation, motorcycles, sailing and photography.

Raid

According to the United Nations, the fighting began at around 9 AM when Hezbollah launched rockets on Israeli towns along the Lebanese border, apparently as a diversion. A force then attacked two armored IDF Humvees patrolling the border near the Israeli village of Zar'it with anti-tank rockets, and abducted the two soldiers. An Israeli Merkava Mk. II tank was damaged by a 200 kg improvised explosive device, while attempting to give pursuit, killing all four crewmembers.

Prisoner swap

On 16 July 2008, Hezbollah transferred the coffins of Ehud Goldwasser and Eldad Regev, in exchange for Lebanese militant Samir Kuntar and four Hezbollah fighters captured by Israel during the 2006 Lebanon War, as well as the remains of 199 Lebanese and Palestinian militants.

Aerosmith dedication
On 19 September 2006, rock band Aerosmith dedicated their hit song "Dream On" to Goldwasser at the request of his wife.

See also

Eldad Regev
Gilad Shalit
Israeli MIAs

References

External links

 Official site about the 2006 MIAs  (Shalit, Goldwasser, Regev)
 Event of Two Israeli Soldiers Kidnapped - Ynetnews
 Udi's photography gallery

1975 births
2006 deaths
2006 Lebanon War
Formerly missing people
Israeli military personnel killed in action
Israeli people taken hostage
Israeli soldiers
Place of birth missing
Place of death missing
South African Jews

ar:إيهود غولدفاسر وإلداد ريغف
no:Libanon-krigen (2006)#De israelske soldatene